The Whetstone of Witte is the shortened title of Robert Recorde's mathematics book published in 1557, the full title being The whetstone of ,  is the : The Coßike practise, with the rule of Equation: and the  of Surde Nombers. The book covers topics including whole numbers, the extraction of roots and irrational numbers. The work is notable for containing the first recorded use of the equals sign and also for being the first book in English to use the plus and minus signs.

Recordian notation for exponentiation, however, differed from the later Cartesian notation .  Recorde expressed indices and surds larger than 3 in a systematic form based on the prime factorization of the exponent: a factor of two he termed a zenzic, and a factor of three, a cubic. Recorde termed the larger prime numbers appearing in this factorization sursolids, distinguishing between them by use of ordinal numbers: that is, he defined 5 as the first sursolid, written as ʃz and 7 as the second sursolid, written as Bʃz.
He also devised symbols for these factors: a zenzic was denoted by z, and a cubic by &.  For instance, he referred to p8=p2×2×2 as zzz (the zenzizenzizenzic), and q12=q2×2×3 as zz& (the zenzizenzicubic).

Later in the book he includes a chart of exponents all the way up to p80=p2×2×2×2×5 written as zzzzʃz. There is an error in the chart, however, writing p69 as Sʃz, despite it not being a prime. It should be p3×23 or &Gʃz.

References

External links 
 The Whetstone of Witte at The Internet Archive

Mathematics books
British non-fiction literature
1557 books
History of mathematics